Datuk Frankie Poon Ming Fung is a Malaysian politician who has served as Chairman of the Sabah Development Board (SDB) since January 2023 and Member of the Sabah State Legislative Assembly (MLA) for Tanjong Papat since May 2018. He served as the State Minister of People's Health and Wellbeing of Sabah in the Heritage Party (WARISAN) state administration from May 2019 to the collapse of the WARISAN state administration in September 2020 and the State Minister of Youth and Sports of Sabah from May 2018 to May 2019. He is a member of the Democratic Action Party (DAP), a component party of the Pakatan Harapan (PH) coalition. He has served as the State Chairman of DAP of Sabah since March 2019, in acting capacity from March 2019 to November 2021 and in official capacity since November 2021.

Honours 
  :
  Commander of the Order of Kinabalu (PGDK) - Datuk (2018)

Election results

References

Members of the Sabah State Legislative Assembly
Democratic Action Party (Malaysia) politicians
Living people
1959 births
People from Sandakan